Tazadit Airport  is an airport serving the city of Zouérat in Mauritania.

Airlines and destinations

See also

Transport in Mauritania
List of airports in Mauritania

References

External links
 OurAirports - Mauritania
 Tazadit

Airports in Mauritania